MDA-19 (also known as BZO-HEXOXIZID) is a drug that acts as a potent and selective agonist for the cannabinoid receptor CB2, with reasonable selectivity over the psychoactive CB1 receptor, though with some variation between species. In animal studies it was effective for the treatment of neuropathic pain, but did not effect rat locomotor activity in that specific study. The pharmacology of MDA-19 in rat cannabinoid receptors have been demonstrated to function differently than human cannabinoid receptors with MDA-19 binding to human CB1 receptors 6.9x higher than rat CB1 receptors.

Discovery 

MDA-19 was first synthesized and studied in the late 2000s by researchers at the University of Texas MD Anderson Cancer Center.

Pharmacology 

MDA-19 binds to human CB2 receptors at Ki = 43.3 +/- 10.3 nM and human CB1 receptors at Ki = 162.4 +/- 7.6 nM and functions as an agonist in human cannabinoid receptors but functions differently in rat cannabinoid receptors binding to rat cannabinoid CB2 receptors at Ki = 16.3 +/- 2.1 and CB1 receptors at Ki = 1130 +/- 574 nM binding to rat CB1 receptors 6.9x weaker than human CB1 receptors but increased binding for CB2. MDA-19 is an agonist at human CB1 and CB2 receptors as well as rat CB1 receptors but functions as an inverse agonist in rat CB2 receptors.

Society and Culture 

MDA-19 along with its shortened Pentyl tailchain analog (MDA-19-Pentyl / 5Carbon-MDA-19/ BZO-POXIZID) and its 5-Fluoro Pentyl analog (5F-MDA-19 /5F-BZO-POXIZID) and its Cyclohexylmethyl analog (CHM-MDA-19 / BZO-CHMOXIZID) was identified in synthetic smoke blends seized in the United States as early as September 2021. United States Border Protection Officers identified BZO-4en-POXIZID (also known as 4en-pentyl-MDA-19) as early as February, 2022 The Center for Forensic Science Research & Education (CFSRE) analyzed 11 samples of suspected synthetic smoke blends between May and September 2022 within the Philadelphia area and found the pentyl analog of MDA-19 in 5 out of 11 samples. Despite their reported lower CB1 binding affinity, other low CB1 binding synthetic cannabinoids such as UR-144 (Ki = 150nM CB1 and Ki = 1.8nM CB2) and XLR-11 (EC50 values of 98nM CB1 and 83nM CB2) have been previously identified in smoke blends in 2012.

As of November 2022 MDA-19 is legal in the United States but may be considered illegal if intended for human consumption under the federal analog act.
In China, the May 2021 ban on specific synthetic cannabinoid core classes does not include the class of cannabinoids MDA-19 belongs to.

See also 
 BZO-CHMOXIZID
 JWH-007
 JWH-116
 JWH-196
 AM-1221
 JWH-015
 JWH-047
 JWH-167
 JTE 7-31
 UR-144
 XLR-11

References 

Cannabinoids